Erin Marie Moran-Fleischmann (October 18, 1960 – April 22, 2017) was an American actress, best known for playing Joanie Cunningham on the television sitcom Happy Days and its spin-off Joanie Loves Chachi.

Early life
Erin Marie Moran was born on October 18, 1960 in Burbank, California in the Los Angeles metropolitan area and raised in nearby Los Angeles in the North Hollywood district. She was the second youngest of six children born to Sharon and Edward Moran. Her father was a finance manager, and her interest in acting was supported by her mother, who signed her with a talent agent when she was five years old. Two of her brothers are also actors, John Moran and Tony Moran, the latter of whom played the unmasked Michael Myers in the movie Halloween (1978).

She would publicly accuse her parents of physical and mental abuse in 1992.

Career

Moran's first acting role was at the age of five in a television commercial for First Federal Bank. At the age of seven, she was cast as Jenny Jones in the television series Daktari, during its fourth and final season in 1968. She made her feature-film debut in How Sweet It Is! (1968) with Debbie Reynolds, and made regular appearances on The Don Rickles Show in 1972, and guest appearances in The Courtship of Eddie's Father, My Three Sons, Bearcats!, Family Affair and in The Waltons, in an episode titled "The Song", in 1975.  She also appeared in the television series Gunsmoke.

In 1974, at the age of 13, Moran was cast to play her best-known role as Joanie Cunningham on the sitcom Happy Days, the younger sister of Richie Cunningham (Ron Howard). Moran continued the role in 1982 in the short-lived spin-off series Joanie Loves Chachi. Moran later stated that she had only reluctantly agreed to star in the series because she would have preferred to remain with Happy Days. She won the Young Artist Award for Best Young Actress in a New Television Series for her role. After Joanie Loves Chachi cancellation in 1983, she returned to Happy Days for its final season.

In 1983, Moran said in an interview that the Happy Days producers had pressured her to change from about the age of 15: They "suddenly wanted me to lose weight and become this sexy thing."

In the following years, Moran made several other television guest appearances, including The Love Boat, Murder, She Wrote, and Diagnosis: Murder, and starred opposite Edward Albert in the cult sci-fi horror film Galaxy of Terror (1981). She would become estranged from the Happy Days cast, with People claiming that she called them "evil" in an interview, a statement she would deny on a later talk show.

In 2008, she was a contestant on VH1's reality show Celebrity Fit Club. Two years later, she made an appearance in the independent comedy feature Not Another B Movie (2010). In 2013, despite reports that she would be reunited with Happy Days co-stars Henry Winkler, Ron Howard, and Scott Baio in the fourth season of Arrested Development, she did not appear in the revamped Netflix series.

Happy Days lawsuit
On April 19, 2011, Moran, three of her Happy Days co-stars—Don Most, Anson Williams, and Marion Ross—and the estate of Tom Bosley, who died in 2010, filed a $10 million breach-of-contract lawsuit against CBS, which owns the show. The suit claimed that cast members had not been paid merchandising revenues owed under their contracts. Revenues included those from show-related items such as comic books, T-shirts, scrapbooks, trading cards, games, lunch boxes, dolls, toy cars, magnets, greeting cards, and DVDs with cast members' likenesses on the box covers. Their contracts entitled the actors to be paid 5% of the net proceeds of merchandising if a single actor's likeness was used, and half that amount if the cast members were pictured in a group. CBS stated it owed the actors between $8,500 and $9,000 each, most of it from slot-machine revenues, but the group stated they were owed millions. The lawsuit was initiated after Ross was informed by a friend playing slots at a casino of a Happy Days machine on which players won the jackpot when five Marion Rosses were rolled.

In October 2011, a judge rejected the group's claim of fraud, thereby eliminating the possibility of recouping millions of dollars in damages. On June 5, 2012, a judge denied a motion to dismiss filed by CBS, which meant the case would go to trial on July 17 if not settled by then. In July 2012, the actors settled their lawsuit with CBS; each received a payment of $65,000 and a promise from CBS to continue honoring the terms of their contracts.

Personal life and death
In 1987, Moran married Rocky Ferguson. They divorced in 1993. Later that year, she married Steven Fleischmann.

After Happy Days and Joanie Loves Chachi were canceled, Moran moved from Los Angeles to the California mountains. She said in 1988 that she suffered from depression and was unable to get acting roles. Moran confirmed news reports that her California home was foreclosed on in 2010, following media claims that she had been served eviction papers and moved into her mother-in-law's trailer home in Indiana. In 2017, Variety wrote that she "had fallen on hard times in recent years. She was reportedly kicked out of her trailer-park home in Indiana because of her hard-partying ways."

On April 22, 2017, authorities in Corydon, Indiana were alerted about an unresponsive female, later identified as Moran. She later was pronounced dead at the age of 56. An autopsy report from the Harrison County coroner indicated the cause of death to be complications of stage four squamous cell carcinoma of the throat. Toxicology testing showed that no illegal narcotics were involved in her death, and no illegal substances were found in Moran's home. Moran's husband, in an open letter released through her co-star Scott Baio, confirmed that she first experienced symptoms of throat cancer around Thanksgiving 2016 and deteriorated rapidly from that point, and that the facilities that had unsuccessfully attempted to treat her cancer had not made anyone aware of how badly the cancer had metastasized.

Filmography and television appearances

 1967: Who's Minding the Mint? as Little Girl on Tricycle (uncredited)
 1968: How Sweet It Is! as Laurie
 1968: Stanley vs. the System
 1968–69: Daktari as Jenny Jones
 1969: Death Valley Days as Mary Tugwell (2 episodes)
 1969: 80 Steps to Jonah as Kim
 1969: The Happy Ending as Marge Wilson as a Child (uncredited)
 1970: The Courtship of Eddie's Father as Emily Ruth Gustafson
 1970–1973: The F.B.I. as Vickie Florea / Cindy Marot (2 episodes)
 1970: My Three Sons as Victoria Lewis
 1970: Watermelon Man as Janice Gerber
 1970–71: Family Affair as Amy / Mary Ellen / Janet (3 episodes)
 1971: O'Hara, U.S. Treasury as Little Girl
 1971: The Smith Family as Julie
 1971: Bearcats! as Elisa Tillman
 1971: Gunsmoke as Rachel / Jenny (2 episodes)
 1972: The Don Rickles Show as Janie Robinson
 1973: Lisa, Bright and Dark as Tracy Schilling
 1973: The F.B.I. as Morrie Prager's daughter (S9E6)
 1974–1984: Happy Days as Joanie Cunningham (234 episodes)
 1975: The Waltons as Sally Ann Harper
 1975: Dinah! as Herself
 1976: The Captain and Tennille as Herself
 1977: The Magic Pony (voice)
 1978–79: The Mike Douglas Show as Herself (2 episodes)
 1978–79: The Hollywood Squares as Herself (6 episodes)
 1979: Greatest Heroes of the Bible as Tova
 1979: Sitcom: The Adventures of Garry Marshall as Herself (uncredited)
 1980–1985: The Love Boat as Carrie Walker / Joanne Morgan / Barbara Blatnick / Janet Reynolds (6 episodes)
 1980: Dick Clark's New Year's Rockin' Eve as Herself
 1981: Twirl as Bonnie Lee Jordan
 1981: Galaxy of Terror as Alluma
 1981: 38th Golden Globe Awards as Herself
 1982: 39th Golden Globe Awards as Herself
 1982–83: Joanie Loves Chachi as Joanie Cunningham (17 episodes)
 1983: Hotel as Karen Donnelly
 1984: Glitter as Caroline Mason
 1984: Match Game-Hollywood Squares Hour as Herself (10 episodes)
 1986: Murder, She Wrote as Maggie Roberts
 1992: The Howard Stern Show as Herself
 1996: Dear God as Herself
 1998: Diagnosis: Murder as Cynthia Bennett
 1998: Desperation Boulevard as Herself
 1999: Celebrity Profile as Herself
 1999: Good vs. Evil as Herself
 1999: Entertainment Tonight Presents: Happy Days - Secrets as Herself
 2000: I Love 1970's as Herself
 2001: TVography: Happy Days as Herself
 2001: Weakest Link as Herself
 2001–2003: Hollywood Squares as Herself (7 episodes)
 2002: Inside TV Land: 40 Greatest Theme Songs as Herself
 2003: ABC's 50th Anniversary Celebration as Herself
 2003: Dickie Roberts: Former Child Star as Herself
 2004: Pyramid as Herself
 2005: Happy Days: 30th Anniversary Reunion as Herself
 2006: Where Are They Now? as Herself
 2007: Scott Baio is 45 and Single as Herself
 2007: The Singing Bee as Herself
 2008: Today as Herself
 2008: Celebrity Fit Club: Boot Camp as Herself
 2008: Broken Promise as Mrs. Watkins
 2008: The Early Show as Herself
 2008: Fox Reality Awards as Herself
 2008: Whatever Happened To? as Herself
 2008: Mother Goose Parade as Herself
 2009: The Bold and the Beautiful as Kelly DeMartin
 2009: Catch 21 as Herself
 2010: Not Another B Movie as Mrs. Klien
 2010: Totally Tracked Down as Herself
 2012: The Deceit as Mrs. Shephard (final film role)
 2012: Celebrity Ghost Stories as Herself (final TV role)

Soundtrack
 Dickie Roberts: Former Child Star (2003) ("Child Stars on Your Television")

References

Further reading

External links

 
 
 

1960 births
2017 deaths
Actresses from Burbank, California
American child actresses
American film actresses
American television actresses
Deaths from throat cancer
Deaths from cancer in Indiana
Participants in American reality television series
20th-century American actresses
21st-century American actresses
North Hollywood High School alumni